Spirama triloba is a species of moth of the family Erebidae. It is found in northern India (Himachal Pradesh, West Bengal, Darjeeling), Bangladesh, Cambodia, the Philippines and Indonesia (Java, Sulawesi).

References

Moths described in 1852
Spirama